David Dean (27 July 1847 – 19 June 1919) was an English cricketer.  Dean's batting and bowling styles are unknown.  He was born at Duncton, Sussex.

Dean made two first-class appearances for Sussex against Kent and Surrey in 1871.  Against Kent at the Royal Brunswick Ground, Hove, Dean scored 6 runs in Sussex's first-innings before he became one of 9 wickets for George Bennett.  Sussex won the match by an innings and 130 runs.  Against Surrey at The Oval, Dean was dismissed for a single run in Sussex's first-innings by William Marten, while in their second-innings he opened the batting and was dismissed for the same score by Edward Bray.  Sussex won the match by 9 wickets.

He died at Graffham, Sussex on 19 June 1919.  His brother James and uncle Jemmy Dean also played first-class cricket.

References

External links

1847 births
1919 deaths
People from Duncton
English cricketers
Sussex cricketers